Shake It Fast may refer to:

 "Shake It Fast", the clean version of the 2000 single "Shake Ya Ass" by Mystikal
 "Shake It Fast", a 2016 song by Rae Sremmurd